Christian Conley (born October 25, 1992) is an American football wide receiver for the Tennessee Titans of the National Football League (NFL). He played college football for Georgia. He was drafted in the third round of the 2015 NFL Draft by the Kansas City Chiefs. He holds the NFL Combine record for the highest vertical leap of 45 inches.

College career

Conley arrived at Georgia a semester early in January 2011 and played four years under head coach Mark Richt before graduating and entering the 2015 NFL Draft. He finished his freshman season with 16 receptions for 288 receiving yards and two touchdown receptions in 11 games. In 2012, Conley had 20 receptions for 342 yards and six touchdowns in 14 games. He returned for his junior season in 2013 and caught a career-high 45 passes for 651 receiving yards and was limited to four touchdown receptions in 11 games. His final year at Georgia was in 2014, where he finished with 36 receptions for  657 receiving yards and a career-high eight touchdown receptions.

College statistics

Professional career
On January 17, 2015, Conley caught two passes for 45 yards in the NFLPA Collegiate Bowl in Carson, California and was a part of Mike Martz's National team that defeated the American team 17–0. Conley was one of 47 collegiate wide receivers to attend the NFL Scouting Combine in Indianapolis, Indiana. He had an impressive performance and tied for third among wide receivers in the 40-yard dash and finished fourth among them in the bench press. His broad jump was best among his position group with the second closest being Auburn's Sammie Coates (10'9"). On March 18, 2015, he attended Georgia's pro day, along with Todd Gurley, Amarlo Herrera, Damian Swann, Ramik Wilson, and 13 other prospects. Team representatives and scouts from 25 NFL teams attended, that included Tennessee Titans' head coach Ken Whisenhunt, as Conley opted to stand on his combine numbers and only perform positional drills. Throughout the draft process, he met with a few teams for private workouts and meetings, including the Philadelphia Eagles, Dallas Cowboys, and Cleveland Browns. At the conclusion of the pre-draft process, Conley was projected to be a third round pick by NFL draft experts and scouts. He was ranked as the 13th best wide receiver in the draft by NFLDraftScout.com.

Kansas City Chiefs (first stint)
The Kansas City Chiefs selected Conley in the third round (76th overall) of the 2015 NFL Draft. He was the 12th wide receiver selected in 2015.

2015
On May 14, 2015, the Kansas City Chiefs signed Conley to a four-year, $3.12 million contract that includes a signing bonus of $712,434.

Throughout his first training camp, Conley competed against De'Anthony Thomas, Jason Avant, Frankie Hammond, and Albert Wilson for the No. 2 wide receiver role. Conley suffered an injury during training camp after having a strong start in OTA's. Head coach Andy Reid named Conley the fifth wide receiver on the depth chart, behind Jeremy Maclin, Albert Wilson, Jason Avant, and De'Anthony Thomas.

He made his professional regular season debut in the Kansas City Chiefs' season-opening 27–20 victory over the Houston Texans. On September 28, 2015, Conley caught his first career reception on a 16-yard pass by Alex Smith before being tackled by Green Bay Packers' safety Haha Clinton-Dix in the fourth quarter of a 38–28 loss. The following week,  he earned his first career start after Albert Wilson was unable to play due to a recurring shoulder injury. Conley finished the 36–21 loss at the Cincinnati Bengals with two receptions for 53 yards. On October 25, 2015, Conley caught a season-high six passes for 63 receiving yards and a touchdown during the Chiefs' 23–13 win against the Pittsburgh Steelers. He made his first career touchdown reception on a six-yard pass from Alex Smith in the fourth quarter to seal the Chiefs' victory.

The Kansas City Chiefs finished second in the AFC West with an 11–5 record and received a playoff berth as a wildcard team. On January 9, 2016, Conley played in his first career playoff game and caught one pass for a nine-yard touchdown during the Chiefs' 30–0 AFC Wildcard victory over the Houston Texans. The following game, Conley caught five passes for 33 yards as the Kansas City Chiefs lost 27–20 to the New England Patriots in the AFC Divisional playoff game.

2016
Conley returned to training camp in 2016 and competed for the job as the No. 2 wide receiver against Albert Wilson, Frankie Hammond, De'Anthony Thomas, Rod Streater, and Tyreek Hill. Conley was named the No. 3 wide receiver behind Jeremy Maclin and Albert Wilson to start the regular season.

He started the Kansas City Chiefs' season-opener against the San Diego Chargers and caught four passes for 43 yards during their 33–27 victory. On October 2, 2016, Conley made a season-high six receptions for 70 receiving yards in the Chiefs' 43–14 loss at the Pittsburgh Steelers. In his first season under offensive coordinators Brad Childress and Matt Nagy, Conley made 44 receptions for 530 receiving yards in 16 games and 11 starts. The Chiefs finished the  season atop the AFC West and received a playoff berth before being eliminated by the Pittsburgh Steelers in the AFC Wildcard game. Conley started the 18–16 loss and was limited to two receptions for 19 yards.

2017
Throughout training camp, Conley competed for the No. 1 wide receiver position after Jeremy Maclin was released to free up cap space on June 2, 2017. He competed against Tyreek Hill, Albert Wilson, De'Anthony Thomas, and Demarcus Robinson. Head coach Andy Reid named him the starting wide receiver, alongside Tyreek Hill, to begin the 2017 season.

He started the Kansas City Chiefs' season-opener at the New England Patriots and made two receptions for 43 yards during their 42–27 victory. The following week, he caught a season-high four passes for 55 yards as the Chiefs defeated the Philadelphia Eagles 27–20. On October 8, 2017, Conley caught three passes for 46 receiving yards before leaving after suffering an achilles injury. The injury occurred when Conley landed after jumping to recover an onside kick in the fourth quarter of their 42–34 victory at the Houston Texans on Sunday Night Football On October 14, 2017, the Kansas City Chiefs officially placed Conley on injured/reserve with a ruptured achilles that effectively ended his season. In five games and five starts, Conley caught 11 passes for 175 receiving yards.

2018
In the 2018 season, Conley appeared in all 16 games and recorded 32 receptions for 334 receiving yards and five receiving touchdowns.

Jacksonville Jaguars
Conley signed with the Jacksonville Jaguars on March 16, 2019. On August 31, 2019, Conley was placed on the final 53-man roster for the Jaguars.
Conley made his debut with the Jaguars in Week 1 against his former team, the Kansas City Chiefs.  In the game, Conley caught six passes for 97 yards and a touchdown as the Jaguars lost 40–26. In Week 8 against the New York Jets, Conley caught four passes for 103 yards, including a 70-yard touchdown, in the 29–15 win. In Week 15 against the Oakland Raiders, Conley caught four passes for 49 yards and two touchdowns from Gardner Minshew late in the fourth quarter of the 20–16 comeback victory. Overall, Conley finished the 2019 season with 47 receptions for 775 receiving yards and five receiving touchdowns.

Houston Texans
On March 29, 2021, Conley signed a one-year contract with the Houston Texans.

On March 23, 2022, Conley re-signed with the Texans. He was released on August 30, 2022, and re-signed to the practice squad. He was released on October 4, 2022.

Kansas City Chiefs (second stint) 
Conley was signed to Kansas City Chiefs' practice squad on October 6, 2022.

Tennessee Titans
On October 25, 2022, Conley was signed by the Tennessee Titans off the Chiefs practice squad. He was waived on November 16, 2022. He was re-signed to the practice squad five days later. He was signed back to the active roster on December 10, 2022.

Personal life
Conley has two siblings and was raised by his parents Christina and Charles Conley. His father had a career in the United States Air Force. Conley was born in Adana, Turkey at Incirlik Air Base and spent most of his early life on USAF bases.  His mother is a high school teacher. He was raised as a devout Christian and was named Christian at birth.

Conley began playing football during his freshman year at North Paulding High School in Dallas, Georgia. He received numerous accolades at North Paulding, including being an All-state chorus member. During elementary school, Conley won a regional third grade science fair where he received a $5,000 savings bond, a trip with his family to nationals in Chicago, Illinois, and was able to meet Television personality and master carpenter Bob Vila.

He is a fan of superheroes, citing Superman movies as one of his favorites to watch and DC Comics as his favorite. Conley is close with former Chiefs' teammate Jeremy Maclin and is a fan of the TV show Game of Thrones and the Star Wars franchise.

Georgia
While at the University of Georgia, Conley wrote, directed, and starred in a Star Wars fan-film Retribution.

During his time at Georgia, he served two terms on the Southeastern Conference and the NCAA Student-Athlete Advisory Committees. He graduated from Georgia in December 2014 with a degree in journalism.

References

External links
Georgia Bulldogs bio
 

1992 births
Living people
People from Dallas, Georgia
Players of American football from Georgia (U.S. state)
American football wide receivers
Georgia Bulldogs football players
Kansas City Chiefs players
Jacksonville Jaguars players
Houston Texans players
Tennessee Titans players